There are a number of high schools in the United States named Houston High School, including:

Houston High School (Houston, Alaska)
Houston High School (Houston, Minnesota)
Houston High School (Houston, Mississippi)
Houston High School (Houston, Missouri), listed on the National Register of Historic Places
Houston High School (Ohio)
Houston High School (Germantown, Tennessee)
Houston High School (El Paso, Texas)
Houston High School (Houston, Texas), now known as Sam Houston Math, Science, and Technology Center

See also
Sam Houston High School (disambiguation)